The 1951 Michigan State Spartans football team was an American football team that represented Michigan State College as an independent during the 1951 college football season. In their fifth season under head coach Clarence Munn, the Spartans compiled a perfect 9–0 record and outscored opponents by a total of 270 to 114. The Spartans played their home games at Macklin Stadium (now known as Spartan Stadium) in East Lansing, Michigan.

In the final AP and UPI coaches polls, both released on December 3, 1951, Michigan State was ranked No. 2 behind No. 1 Tennessee. Tennessee went on to lose to No. 3 Maryland in the 1952 Sugar Bowl. However, neither the AP nor UPI took post-bowl poll in this time period.  In later rankings and analyses, Michigan State was recognized as the 1951 national champion by three NCAA-recognized selectors: Billingsley Report, Helms Athletic Foundation, and Poling System. Other selectors have designated Maryland as the national champion.

Two Michigan State players, end Bob Carey and tackle Don Coleman, were recognized as consensus first-team players on the 1951 College Football All-America Team. Two other Spartans were designated as first-team All-Americans by one or more selectors: Al Dorow (first-team defensive back selected by the International News Service) and Jim Ellis (first-team defensive back selected by the Chicago Tribune.

Schedule

References

Michigan State
Michigan State Spartans football seasons
College football undefeated seasons
Michigan State Spartans football